The Lenox Round Barn is a historic building that is part of the Taylor County Historical Museum in Bedford, Iowa, United States. The true round barn was built somewhere between 1905 and 1907. It features white vertical siding, a large cupola, and a two-pitch roof.

It remained on the family's farm until 1996 when they donated it to the Taylor County Historical Society. The barn was moved to their museum grounds in May 1998. It has been listed on the National Register of Historic Places since 1999. Its primary significance is its architectural value. Of primary interest are the steep-pitched free-standing roof, the tornado-resistant support beams, and the pieshaped circular grain bins.

References

Infrastructure completed in 1905
Bedford, Iowa
Buildings and structures in Taylor County, Iowa
National Register of Historic Places in Taylor County, Iowa
Barns on the National Register of Historic Places in Iowa
Round barns in Iowa
1905 establishments in Iowa